The Bruce Tunnel is on the summit pound of the Kennet and Avon Canal between Wootton Top Lock and Crofton Locks in Wiltshire, England.

It is named after Thomas Brudenell-Bruce, 1st Earl of Ailesbury (1729–1814), the local landowner, who, when the canal was being built, would not allow a deep cutting through his land, and insisted on a tunnel instead.

At the eastern end of the tunnel is a plaque commemorating its construction:

The tunnel has red brick portals, capped with Bath stone, each with a decorative plaque of Pennant stone. Construction was begun in 1806 and finished in 1809. It is lined with English bond brickwork and has a wide bore to cope with the 'Newbury Barges' used on this canal.

There is no towpath through the tunnel, so walkers and cyclists must walk across the top of the hill. When canal boats were still pulled by horses, the boatmen had to haul boats through the tunnel by hand, pulling on chains that ran along the inside walls.

To the north lies the Savernake Forest which is open to the public with footpaths, drives and picnic sites, hence the tunnel is also sometimes known as the Savernake Tunnel.

The main Paddington to Penzance 'Berks and Hants' railway line crosses the tunnel diagonally; both portals can be seen (from different points along the railway) from the windows of passing trains with the canal running close to the railway at each end.

See also

Locks on the Kennet and Avon Canal

References

Tunnels completed in 1809
Canal tunnels in England
Kennet and Avon Canal
Canals in Wiltshire
Tunnels in Wiltshire